The 2008–09 Santosh Trophy qualification was the qualifying round for the 2008–09 edition of the Santosh Trophy, the premier association football competition in India for teams representing their state football associations. It began on 24 May and ended on 1 June 2009.

Twenty-seven teams entered the competition and were divided into eight 'clusters' to play the qualification after Nagaland pulled out. The winner of each cluster were to move to the pre-quarter final knock-out round from which four would progress to the quarter-final stage. Punjab, Services, Bengal and Karnataka were directly seeded to the quarterfinal league.

Qualification

Cluster I

Cluster II

Cluster III

Cluster IV

Cluster V

Cluster VI

Cluster VII

Cluster VIII

Pre-quarterfinals

References

2008–09 Santosh Trophy